The House at 107 Waban Hill Road in eastern Newton, Massachusetts is one of the city's finest examples of formal Italianate styling, set high on Waban Hill with   The two story wood-frame house was built c. 1875, and exhibits the full range of Italianate elements, including an extended bracketed eave, quoined corners, elaborate, heavily pedimented windows, and the shallow-pitch central gable on the flushboarded main facade.  The main entrance is sheltered by an arched portico, and the roof is topped by a square cupola with bands of narrow round-arch windows on each side.

The house was listed on the National Register of Historic Places in 1986.

See also
 National Register of Historic Places listings in Newton, Massachusetts

References

Houses on the National Register of Historic Places in Newton, Massachusetts
Italianate architecture in Massachusetts
Houses completed in 1875